Conus nobilis, common name the noble cone, is a species of sea snail, a marine gastropod mollusk in the family Conidae, the cone snails and their allies.

Like all species within the genus Conus, these snails are predatory and venomous.

Subspecies
 Conus nobilis renateae Cailliez, 1993 (synonym: Eugeniconus nobilis renateae (Cailliez, 1993))
 Conus nobilis skinneri da Motta, 1982 (synonyms: Conus skinneri da Motta, 1982; Eugeniconus nobilis skinneri (da Motta, 1982))
 Conus nobilis victor Broderip, 1842 (synonyms: Conus nobilis abbai Poppe & Tagaro, 2011; Conus nobilis var. vincoomnes Lichtenstein, 1794)
 Conus nobilis bitleri da Motta, 1984: synonym of Conus cordigera G. B. Sowerby II, 1866
 Conus nobilis cordigera G. B. Sowerby, 1866: synonym of Conus cordigera G. B. Sowerby II, 1866

Description
The size of an adult shell varies between 29 mm and 71 mm. The spire is depressed, with sulcate and finely striate volutions. The shoulder angles are sharp. The color of the shell is yellowish brown or chestnut, with close revolving lines of numerous small chestnut spots. The whole surface is irregularly overlaid by triangular large white spots.

Distribution
This marine species is found in sublittoral and deeper waters of the Indo-Pacific from Sri Lanka, the Andaman Islands and Nicobar Islands along Sumatra and Java to Timor; along the Marquesas Islands.

References

 Linnaeus, C. (1758). Systema Naturae per regna tria naturae, secundum classes, ordines, genera, species, cum characteribus, differentiis, synonymis, locis. Editio decima, reformata. Laurentius Salvius: Holmiae. ii, 824 pp 
 Filmer R.M. (2001). A Catalogue of Nomenclature and Taxonomy in the Living Conidae 1758 – 1998. Backhuys Publishers, Leiden. 388pp. 
 Tucker J.K. (2009). Recent cone species database. September 4, 2009 Edition
 Tucker J.K. & Tenorio M.J. (2009) Systematic classification of Recent and fossil conoidean gastropods. Hackenheim: Conchbooks. 296 pp
 Puillandre N., Duda T.F., Meyer C., Olivera B.M. & Bouchet P. (2015). One, four or 100 genera? A new classification of the cone snails. Journal of Molluscan Studies. 81: 1–23

External links
 The Conus Biodiversity website
 

nobilis
Gastropods described in 1758
Taxa named by Carl Linnaeus